Deus Ex Machina (band) is an Italian progressive rock group. Members include Claudio Trotta (drums), Alessandro Porreca (bass) Maurino Collina (guitar), Alessandro Bonetti (violin) Luigi Ricciardiello (keyboards) and Alberto Piras (vocals).

Discography
 Gladium Caeli (1990)
 Deus Ex Machina (1992)
 De Republica (1994)
 Non Est Ars Quae ad Effectum Casus Venit (live) (1995)
 Diacronie Metronomiche (live) (1996)
 Equilibrismo da Insofferenza (1998)
 Cinque (2002)
 Imparis (2008)
 Devoto (2016)

References

External links
 
 
 

Italian progressive rock groups
Cuneiform Records artists
Musical groups from Bologna